In the 2005–06 season, Ulster were Celtic League champions for the first time. This was their eleventh season under professionalism, and their second under head coach Mark McCall. They also competed in the Heineken Cup.

In pre-season, Gary Longwell replaced Maurice Field as head of the academy. Scrum-half Neil Doak retired as a player and became a High Performance Coach with the academy. Flanker and captain Andy Ward also retired. New signings included Australian international lock Justin Harrison, and Irish-qualified New Zealand-born scrum-half Isaac Boss. Prop Justin Fitzpatrick returned from Castres Olympique.

Ulster finished top of the table in the Celtic League. Tommy Bowe was the league's top try scorer with ten. David Humphreys was second top points scorer with 229, and second leading marksman with 81 successful goal kicks. Justin Harrison was joint top of the appearances table with 20. In the Heineken Cup, they finished third in Pool 4, failing to qualify for the knockout stage.

Players who made their debuts this season include flanker Stephen Ferris, prop Declan Fitzpatrick, centre Andrew Trimble, and lock Ryan Caldwell, Andrew Trimble was Ulster's Player of the Year, and IRUPA Newcomer of the Year. Neil Best won the IRUPA Unsung Hero award.

Staff

Squad

Senior squad

Players in

  Isaac Boss (from Waikato)
  Justin Harrison (from New South Wales)
  Justin Fitzpatrick from (Castres Olympique)
  John Andress (from Academy)
  Lewis Stevenson (from Academy)
  Oisin Hennessey (from Academy)

Players out

  Andy Ward (retired)
  Neil Doak (retired)
  Gary Longwell (retired)
  Matt Mustchin (to Edinburgh)
  Tim Barker (to Glasgow)
  Ronan McCormack (to Leinster)
  Seamus Mallon (to Northampton Saints)

2005–06 Heineken Cup

Pool 4

2005-06 Celtic League

Home attendance

Ulster Rugby Awards

The Ulster Rugby Awards ceremony was held at the Ramada Hotel on 18 May 2006. Winners were:

Bank of Ireland Ulster Player of the Year: Andrew Trimble
Guinness Ulster Rugby Personality of the Year: Justin Harrison
UTV Young Player of the Year: Stephen Ferris
Northern Bank Schools Player of the Year: Stephen Douglas, RBAI
Kukri Sportswear Club of the Year: Rainey Old Boys
Calor Gas Youth Player of the Year: William Stewart, Ballyclare
Dorrington B. Faulkner Award: Ian Beggs, Carrickfergus
First Trust Club Player of the Year: Glenn Moore, QUB

References

2005-06
Ulster
Ulster
Ulster